The protected areas of Sudan include national parks, marine national parks, wildlife sanctuaries, bird sanctuaries, game reserves, nature conservation areas, and managed nature reserves.

National parks
 Dinder National Park
 Jebel Hassania National Park
 Radom National Park
 Suakin Archipelago National Park

Marine national parks
 Port Sudan Marine National Park
 Sanganeb Atoll Marine National Park

Wildlife sanctuaries
 Erkawit Wildlife Sanctuary
 Erkawit Sinkat Wildlife Sanctuary

Bird sanctuaries
 Jebel Aulia Dam Bird Sanctuary
 Lake Keilak Bird Sanctuary
 Lake Kundi Bird Sanctuary
 Lake Nubia Bird Sanctuary

Game reserves
 Tokor Game Reserve
 Sabaloka Game Reserve

Nature conservation areas
 Jebel Marra Nature Conservation Area
 Jebel Elba Nature Conservation Area

Managed nature reserves
 Mukawwar Managed Nature Reserve

International designations

Biosphere reserves
 Dinder National Park
 Radom National Park

World Heritage Sites
 Sanganeb Marine National Park and Dungonab Bay - Mukkawar Island Marine National Park

Ramsar Sites
 Dongonab Bay-Marsa Waiai
 Suakin-Gulf of Agig
 Dinder National Park

References

 
Sudan
protected areas